"Never Let You Go" is a song by American DJ Slushii featuring Mexican singer Sofía Reyes. It was released through Big Beat Records on January 18, 2019.

Composition
"Never Let You Go" is a dancehall, moombahton-tropical EDM song with chill production, dreamy elements and electric guitar break. Billboard described it as "dancehall-inspired rhythm lays the foundation for a fruit-flavored future-style melody." It was written by both artists with Aviella Winder.

Music video
An accompanied music video released on the same day featuring both artists in supermarket. According to the director Tim Fox, some of elements made up of anime imagery such as Pokémon. He stated that "I wanted to add a bit of my own dark humour so it didn't feel orientated at kids, so there are characters vomiting, eating each other and doing rainbow poo's. However my five year old niece absolutely loves this video. She was the influence behind the unicorn doing a rainbow poo."

Charts

Release history

References

External links
 Never Let You Go on Metrolyrics
 Never Let You Go on Genius

2019 singles
2019 songs
Big Beat Records (American record label) singles